Andslimoen is a village in Målselv Municipality in Troms og Finnmark county, Norway. The village, which lies along the river Målselva in the Målselvdalen valley in the western part of the municipality, is part of the urban area known as Bardufoss.

References

Villages in Troms
Målselv
Populated places of Arctic Norway